René Alfonso Morales Tame (born 25 May 1940), known as Alfonso Morales and more popularly as Pocho Morales, is a Chilean former football player who played as a centre-back.

Early years
Born in Coquimbo, a port city in Chile, his father was Spanish and his mother was Bolivian. As a child, Morales played for Club Atlético Llano and took part of the Coquimbo team for the 1955 national youth championship in Rancagua at the age of 14.

A complete sportsman, he played roller hockey, basketball for Club Atenas and water polo, being called up to the Chile squad for the 1958 national tournament in Valparaíso.

Career
Morales played for both Coquimbo Unido and Deportes La Serena, traditional opponents in the Coquimbo Region, being considered a legendary player of the first. The matches when he was a player of Coquimbo Unido, where also took part Arturo Canilla Díaz, are well remembered, according to the former footballer and opponent, Hernán Godoy.

Along with Coquimbo Unido, he got promotion to Primera División, the first title for the club, after winning the 1962 Segunda División, in the last matchday versus Universidad Técnica del Estado what he considers "an unforgettable game". The 1963 season, was the first for Coquimbo Unido in the Primera División.

He stayed with Coquimbo Unido until 1966. The club was in Primera División for 3 seasons from 1963 to 1965. In 1965 it was relegated to Segunda División after one of the worst seasons for a Chilean club, according to Morales.  In 1967, he switched to Deportes La Serena, staying with the club until the 1970 season in Primera División.

Despite he didn't take part of any Chile national team, he frequently was chose as one of the best centre-backs in the magazine rankings. As an anecdote, in times when football was more aggressive, having hard duels with players such as Hernán Godoy and Pedro Graffigna, he stunned Carlos Campos from Universidad de Chile by an accidental headbutt.

Following his retirement, he performed as Sport Manager of Coquimbo Unido in the 1970s.

Personal life
His nickname, Pocho, is a short form of Alfonso. While he was a player, he was nicknamed Mariscal (Marshal).

He stated that his football idols were Arturo Farías from Deportes La Serena and Raúl Sánchez from Santiago Wanderers. He has a close friendship with José Sulantay, who was an opponent in football.

After his retirement, he worked for EMPART Coquimbo, the social security institution for private sector employees for 17 years.

His left leg was amputated due to complications with diabetes.

Honours
Coquimbo Unido
 Segunda División: 1962

References

External links
 

1940 births
Living people
People from Coquimbo
Chilean people of Spanish descent
Chilean people of Bolivian descent
Sportspeople of Spanish descent
Chilean footballers
Coquimbo Unido footballers
Deportes La Serena footballers
Primera B de Chile players
Chilean Primera División players
Association football defenders
Chilean men's basketball players
Chilean male water polo players